Diosmectite (brand names Smecta, Smecdral) is a natural silicate of aluminium and magnesium used as an intestinal adsorbent in the treatment of several gastrointestinal diseases, including infectious and non-infectious acute and chronic diarrhoea, including irritable bowel syndrome diarrhea subtype. Other uses include: chronic diarrhea caused by radiation-induced, chemotherapy-induced, and HIV/AIDS-associated chronic diarrhea.

It is insoluble in water. It is usually taken orally as a suspension in warm water. In the field of geology, it is more commonly known as montmorillonite. Diosmectite is a contraction of "dioctahedral smectite".

Mechanism of action
Its effectiveness in improving stool consistency is the result of its alleged ability to absorb bacteria, viruses and toxins as well as strengthening the intestinal mucus barrier to reduce luminal antigens passing through the mucus barrier which in turn helps to reduce inflammation.

Diosmectite may be a useful additive in the treatment of acute childhood diarrhoea. As evidence is of ‘low quality’, future research is needed with higher quality designs before any firm recommendations can be made.

See also 
 Geophagy
 Medicinal clay

References

Further reading 

 

Digestive system
Medicinal clay